Alp Er Tunga or Alp Er Tonğa (Alp  "brave, hero, conqueror, warrior", Er "man, male, soldier, Tom", Tonğa "Siberian tiger") is a mythical Turkic hero who was mentioned in Mahmud al-Kashgari's Dīwān Lughāt al-Turk, Yusuf Balasaguni's Kutadgu Bilig and in the Vatican manuscript of Oghuznama by an unknown writer.

In Turkic literature he is considered to be the same character as Afrasiab in the Persian Epic Shahnameh. He is sometimes mentioned as a khan of Saka (Scythia).

The Karakhanids claimed to have descended from Alper Tonga.

Alp Er Tunga Epic

Sources

External links
A king's book of kings: the Shah-nameh of Shah Tahmasp, an exhibition catalog from The Metropolitan Museum of Art (fully available online as PDF),Which includes the name of the Turks at the time of the formation of the Western and Eastern Khaganates and said of the inter-ethnicity of the Iranians and the Turanians that Tor or Touraj is the son of Fereydoun and Iraj's brother, and shows that the Turks are not Turanians.

Turkic rulers
Turkic mythology
Heroes in mythology and legend
Mythological kings
Shahnameh